Stegodexamene is a genus of trematodes in the family Aephnidiogenidae.

Species
Stegodexamene anguillae MacFarlane, 1951
Stegodexamene callista Watson, 1984
Stegodexamene watsoni Cribb, 1988

References

Aephnidiogenidae
Trematode genera